The first USS Commodore was a steamer acquired by the Union Navy during the American Civil War. She was used by the Union Navy to patrol navigable waterways of the Confederacy to prevent the South from trading with other countries.

Civil War service 

Commodore, a side wheel steamer, was built at New Orleans, Louisiana, and fitted for service with the West Gulf Blockading Squadron during 1863. On 31 July 1863 Acting Master John R. Hamilton was ordered to her command with instructions to patrol in Lake Pontchartrain, Louisiana. The small steamer remained there throughout the war.

Renamed Fort Gaines 

She was renamed Fort Gaines on 1 September 1864.

Post-war decommissioning and disposal 

Commodore was  sold at New Orleans, 12 August 1865.

References

See also 

 Union Navy

Ships of the Union Navy
Ships built in New Orleans
Steamships of the United States Navy
Gunboats of the United States Navy
American Civil War patrol vessels of the United States
1863 ships